Pro Musica may refer to:

 Seattle Pro Musica, a choir based in Seattle, Washington
 New York Pro Musica,  an ensemble that specialized in medieval and Renaissance music
 Oxford Pro Musica Singers, a chamber choir based in Oxford, England
 Pro-Música Brasil, a representative body of the record labels in the Brazilian phonographic market

See also
 Pro Musica Antiqua (disambiguation)